The Battle of Peach Orchard may refer to:
 The Battle of Peach Orchard during the Battle of Nashville.
 The engagement fought in The Peach Orchard during the Battle of Gettysburg.